James Hayman, sometimes credited as Jim Hayman, is an American television producer, director and cinematographer.

Career
His credits include Judging Amy, Ugly Betty, Joan of Arcadia, Kingpin, The Sopranos, Any Day Now, ER, Lois & Clark: The New Adventures of Superman, Law & Order: Special Victims Unit, Huff, House M.D., The Client, Murder One, Texasville, Northern Exposure, Moon Over Miami, Law & Order, Harts of the West, Class of '96, Dangerous Minds, One West Waikiki, The Fosters, NCIS: New Orleans, NCIS: Hawaii and other series.

Personal life
Hayman is married to actress Annie Potts and is the father of two sons, James (called Doc, born 1992), and Harry (born 1995). He has a stepson Clay (born 1981) from Potts' previous marriage.

Awards and nominations
Hayman has been nominated for two Primetime Emmy Awards and a DGA Award.

References

External links

American cinematographers
American television directors
Living people
People from Paterson, New Jersey
Year of birth missing (living people)
Film directors from New Jersey
Television producers from New Jersey